Lista carniola is a species of moth of the family Pyralidae. It was described by George Hampson in 1916 and is known from Papua New Guinea (it was described from Dinawa).

References

Moths described in 1916
Epipaschiinae